The men's high jump event  at the 1978 European Athletics Indoor Championships was held on 12 March in Milan.

Results

References

High jump at the European Athletics Indoor Championships
High